Iwayaji may mean:

 52601 Iwayaji, an asteroid discovered in 1997
 Iwaya-ji (弥谷寺), a Japanese Buddhist temple in Mitoyo, Kagawa